Derleth is a German surname. Notable people with this surname include:
 Andreas Derleth, German-New Zealand winner of Mr Gay New Zealand 2012.
 August Derleth (1909–1971), American writer and anthologist.
 Ludwig Derleth (1870–1948), German writer
 Robert Derleth (1922–2012), American footballer.

German-language surnames